Tony Kunewalder (October 17, 1962 – May 14, 1995) was a music video director and screenwriter. He began  composing songs, poems, stories and screen plays at an early age. After graduating from the University of Colorado, he led a rock band, directed music videos and sold an original screen play to Oliver Stone which he was about to direct as his first feature film when he was killed in a house fire (at age 32).  His poetry was collected into the book-length POETRYTIME. He has left his mother, Monique Kunewalder, a pianist and linguist who lives in Solana Beach and brother, Nicholas Kunewalder, a race car driver and instructor.

Music videography as director

Links
 Tony Kunewalder, Director, Youtube
 Tony Kunewalder at Music Video Database

References

1962 births
1995 deaths
American music video directors